Horton-in-Ribblesdale is a railway station on the Settle and Carlisle Line, which runs between  and  via . It is owned by Network Rail and managed by Northern Trains.

History
The station was completed by the Midland Railway in 1876 and was opened for passengers on 1 May. It was initially named "Horton". The London Midland and Scottish Railway absorbed the Midland Railway on 1 January 1923 and renamed the station as Horton-in-Ribblesdale on 26 September 1927. 
 
The station buildings were designed by the Midland Railway company architect John Holloway Sanders.

The station is currently (2019) served and managed by Northern, as are all the trains calling at the station. It is unstaffed, with no ticket vending facilities (so tickets can only be purchased in advance or on the train – Northern has stated it plans to provide a ticket machine here in the future). The station waiting room is open for public use, having been restored by the Settle & Carlisle Railway Trust in 2002 as part of a wider refurbishment of the main buildings on the eastern side (other parts of the building are rented out for commercial use).

It is located near to Pen-y-ghent, one of the mountains known collectively as the Yorkshire Three Peaks.

In the 1950s and 1960s under stationmaster Taylor, Horton won the "Best Kept Station" award for 17 consecutive years. The station lost its passenger service on 4 May 1970, but reopened in July 1986, along with several other local stations on the line under British Rail. Goods traffic was handled at the station until 1964, with sidings at the southern end serving the nearby Horton Quarry continuing in use until the early 1980s. These were removed after the station signal box was decommissioned in 1986, but plans to reinstate them (as was done at nearby Arcow Quarry in 2016) are currently under consideration.

Stationmasters

J.H. Preston 1876 – 1877 
H.J. Newth 1877 – 1880
Thomas Rawlings 1880 – 1882 
William Henry Bunce 1882 – 1886 (afterwards station master at Hawes Junction (Garsdale))
Charle James 1886 – 1898
Richard Davies 1898 – ca. 1911
W. Hardy ca. 1914
Albert Daw 1929 – 1938 (afterwards station master at Barnoldswick)
F. Hodgson ca. 1945 ca. 1947
James M. Taylor 1947 - 1959 (afterwards station master at Settle)

Facilities
As the station does not have a footbridge, the platforms are linked by a foot crossing (known in railway terms as a barrow crossing). Both platforms are lower than standard (though the southbound one has been partially raised to improve access to trains); there is no step-free access. Train running information is available via telephone and timetable posters, with digital PIS displays also now available following a rolling upgrade programme of station facilities by operator Northern.

There is a proposal that the station receives a new footbridge (announced in March 2020), thanks to a £1.9 million scheme funded jointly by Network Rail and the government. This will see a fully accessible footbridge (complete with lifts) installed to replace the current barrow crossing. The bridge will also allow a scheme to relay the former quarry sidings (to permit Horton Quarry to dispatch its stone by rail once more) to proceed, as more trains would be shunting in and out of the station. However, the Yorkshire Dales National Park authority have objected to the proposal for a footbridge on the grounds that the design will impede on the conservation area, as the buildings that will house the lift shafts will be prominent above the station.

Service

There are about one train every two hours in each direction: southbound to Leeds (seven in total) and northbound to Carlisle (eight, plus one evening train that terminates at Ribblehead). The total is slightly unbalanced as some trains do not stop here. There is an extra train to Leeds on Saturdays, whilst there are five trains a day to both Leeds and Carlisle on Sundays (one of the former now continues to ).

References

Sources

External links
 
 

Ribblesdale
Railway stations in North Yorkshire
DfT Category F2 stations
Former Midland Railway stations
Railway stations in Great Britain opened in 1876
Railway stations in Great Britain closed in 1970
Railway stations in Great Britain opened in 1986
Reopened railway stations in Great Britain
Northern franchise railway stations
John Holloway Sanders railway stations
Beeching closures in England